Kalateh-ye Hasan (also Romanized as Kalāteh-ye Ḩasan; also known as Kalāteh Kūh Bālā and Kalāteh-ye Kūh Bālā) is a village in Meyghan Rural District, in the Central District of Nehbandan County, South Khorasan Province, Iran. At the 2006 census, its population was 84, in 27 families.

References 

Populated places in Nehbandan County